American rock band Sleeping with Sirens has released six studio albums, one extended play, one live album, one compilation album, 33 singles, and 16 music videos. The band was formed in 2009 by former members of For All We Know and Paddock Park and released their debut album, With Ears to See and Eyes to Hear, a year later. Its second single, "If I'm James Dean, You're Audrey Hepburn", generated increased interest in the band and would later be certified Gold by the Recording Industry Association of America. In 2013, the group achieved their first top-ten release when their third studio album, Feel, entered the Billboard 200 at number three.

Sleeping with Sirens has contributed to three multi-act compilation albums and vocalist Kellin Quinn has collaborated with numerous other artists as a featured performer, including multiple songs with Machine Gun Kelly. The group has sold over one million albums worldwide.

Albums

Studio albums

Live albums

Compilation albums

Extended plays

Singles

Promotional singles

Other appearances
 Punk Goes Pop 4 with "Fuck You" (Cee Lo Green cover)
 Warped Tour 2012 with "Tally It Up: Settle the Score"
 Warped Tour 2013 with "Do It Now Remember It Later"
 This Is Your Sign (Part 1) with "Never Ending Nightmare"; collaboration with Citizen Soldier

Music videos

Notes

References

 Discographies of American artists
 Pop punk group discographies